A business directory is a website or printed listing of information which lists businesses within niche based categories. Businesses can be categorized by niche, location, activity, or size. Business may be compiled either manually or through an automated online search software. Online yellow pages are a type of business directory, as is the traditional phone book.
The details provided in a business directory may vary. They may include the business name, addresses, telephone numbers, location, contact information, type of service or products the business provides, the number of employees, the served region and any professional associations.

Some directories include a section for user reviews, comments, and feedback. Business directories in the past would take a printed format but have recently been upgraded to websites due to the advent of the internet.

Many business directories offer complimentary listings in addition to the premium options. There are many business directories and some of these have moved over to the internet and away from printed format. Whilst not being search engines, business directories often have a search function, enabling users to search businesses by Zip Code, country, state, area or city.

History 

Previous business directories may have been called 'dictionaries', guides or handbooks.

Historians have linked the development of trade directories such as Kelly's trade directory, Bradshaw's railway timetables and guides and Mitchell's Press Directories to the growth of 'rational, scientific inquiry' and statistics in the nineteenth century.

Formats 
Business directories can be in either hard copy or in digital format. Ease of use and distribution means that many trade directories have a digital version.

See also
Web directory
List of web directories
Surplus Record Machinery & Equipment Directory

References

External links
 

Business
Directories